Pierre H. Dubois (born Amsterdam, 2 July 1917 – died The Hague, 24 March 1999) was a Dutch writer and critic.  He was awarded the Constantijn Huygens Prize in 1952, for Een houding in de tijd, and again in 1985.

Works
 1940 - A.C. Willink
 1941 - In den vreemde
 1942 - Het gemis
 1945 - De semaphoor
 1947 - Quia absurdum
 1950 - Een houding in de tijd
 1952 - Een vinger op de lippen
 1953 - De ontmoeting
 1953 - F. Bordewijk
 1954 - Voor eigen rekening
 1955 - Facetten van de Nederlandse poëzie
 1956 - Ademhalen
 1958 - In staat van beschuldiging
 1960 - Jan van Nijlen
 1964 - Marcellus Emants, een schrijversleven
 1966 - Het geheim van Antaios
 1966 - Maurice Gilliams
 1966 - Zonder echo
 1968 - Het binnenste buiten
 1970 - Zomeravond in een kleine stad
 1971 - Mettertijd
 1972 and 1977 - Schrijvers in hun landschap
 1976 - De verleiding van Gogol
 1977 - Spinrag van tijd
 1978 - Over Allard Pierson
 1978 - Over Simenon
 1982 - Najaar
 1984 - Een toren van Babel
 1984 - Requiem voor een verleden tijd
 1985 - Kaleidoscopie van een acteur
 1986 - De angst van Belisarius
 1987 - Memoranda 1 - Hermetisch en besterd
 1988 - Memoranda 2 - Retour Amsterdam-Brussel (1942–1952)
 1989 - Memoranda 3 -Een soort van geluk (1952–1980)
 1993 - Frans van stijl, Nederlands van karakter, universeel van geest
 1993 - Zonder vaandel, biografie Belle van Zuylen, met Simone Dubois
 1994 - J. C. Bloem, dichter van het onuitsprekelijke
 1997 - Over de grens van de tijd

References
Pierre H. Dubois at the Digital library for Dutch literature

1917 births
1999 deaths
Dutch male writers
Writers from Amsterdam
Constantijn Huygens Prize winners